Richard Morecroft (born 20 January 1956) is an English-born Australian radio announcer, TV newsreader and presenter, and conservationist. He presented the Adelaide News bulletin, before becoming the long-running host of the nightly bulletin of ABC News NSW from 1983 until 2002. Between 2010 and 2012, he hosted the quiz show Letters and Numbers.

Early life
Morecroft was born in Market Harborough in the English Midlands. His father Peter and mother Phyll moved the family to Adelaide in 1966 for the benefit of his brother Andrew's respiratory problems; Peter set up a dentist's practice there.

Broadcasting career

Morecroft studied English and Drama at the University of Adelaide with thoughts of becoming an actor or teacher. He became involved in the university radio station and auditioned for the ABC before completing his degree. He was hired as a radio announcer and later transferred to work in television, hosting the 7pm Adelaide bulletin for a couple of years before being approached to replace James Dibble who had presented the bulletin since it began in 1956.

He moved to Sydney in 1982 and took over the 7pm Sydney bulletin in July 1983, as well as presenting Behind the News. In 1985, he and Geraldine Doogue co-hosted "The National", the ABC's short-lived experiment with an hour-long nightly news service, combining news and current affairs, with Max Walsh and Richard Carlton as chief reporters. Also during his time with the ABC, Morecroft participated with the ABC's Natural History Unit in the production of Raising Archie, about a flying fox which he raised and used to keep under the news desk while at work. Morecroft presented the 7pm Sydney news bulletin until 2002, and also hosted election-night broadcasts and educational programs.

Morecroft became such a widely recognizable Australian newscaster that he appeared as himself in many Australian movies and television shows during and after his career. Including: Police Rescue (1991–1996), The Roly Poly Man (1993), Wildside (1997–1998) and Red Hill (2010).

He left the ABC in 2002, being replaced by Tony Eastley, and underwent a sea change, moving to a property near Jervis Bay with his partner, artist Alison Mackay. He said he was not retiring, but wanted to work in a different way.

Morecroft returned to the ABC to host Richard Morecroft Goes Wild in 2002, drawing on his passion for environmental issues.

In 2010, it was announced that he would host Letters and Numbers on SBS Television, an Australian version of the French game show Des chiffres et des lettres, on which the British game show Countdown is based. The first program aired on 2 August 2010. Morecroft was joined by crossword compiler David Astle and mathematician Lily Serna.

Environmental activities
Morecroft is a governor of the Taronga Foundation and a director of the Zoological Parks Board of New South Wales. He is a trustee of the World Wide Fund for Nature and is a patron of WIRES.

Publications
His book 20 Years from the Waist Up was published in 2002.

References

ABC News (Australia) presenters
Living people
1956 births
English emigrants to Australia
Articles containing video clips